Ford is an area and electoral ward in the borough of Sefton, Merseyside, North West England. The population of Ford taken at the 2011 census was 12,731.

Ford is situated to the east of Crosby next to Rimrose Valley, and north of Litherland and is in the L21 postcode.

References

External links

Liverpool Street Gallery - Liverpool 21
MultiMap

Towns and villages in the Metropolitan Borough of Sefton